Frederick James Hando MBE (23 March 1888 – 17 February 1970) was a Welsh writer, artist and schoolteacher from Newport.  He chronicled the history, character and folklore of Monmouthshire, which he also called Gwent, in a series of nearly 800 newspaper articles and several books published between the 1920s and 1960s.

Biography
Hando was born in Maindee, Newport, the son of a postmaster Alfred and his wife Miriam, and attended school there. He had two younger brothers, Frank and Harry. He trained at Borough Road College, London, before returning to Newport as a teacher. He served as a gunnery officer with the Royal Engineers in the First World War, where his experiences in Flanders had a profound effect on him.

Hando married Alice Stanton, the daughter of a Newport builder, and the couple had two children – Margaret and John. Alice died while still young. After a number of years, Hando married again to Daisy, a staff member at his school. The couple soon had a son, Robert.

In 1925 he was appointed as the first headmaster of Hatherleigh School in Newport, where one of his pupils was Johnny Morris, later a noted radio and television presenter. Hando adopted an open and progressive teaching style and was described by Miriam Andrews, a former teacher at the school, as "a wonderful headmaster and he made the children very proud of Hatherleigh".
 
His interest in local history was given an impetus when he was asked to provide sketches to illustrate Sir Joseph Bradney's multi-volume A History of Monmouthshire from the Coming of the Normans into Wales down to the Present Time and his first articles about Monmouthshire were published in the South Wales Argus in 1922. The then editor, William Collins agreed to an initial run of 15 articles. In total, he contributed 795 articles to the newspaper between 1922 and 13 February 1970, a few days before his death. Due to their high readership, the page of the Argus on which his articles appeared became particularly prized as advertising space. Many of his articles and drawings were republished in anthologies of his work. In his early writings, Hando was particularly interested in ley lines and the alignment of the sun with stone circles. He said that he wanted to add to what was already on the map and that by studying leys he could reach back in history far beyond Roman Britain.

Hando was organist and choirmaster of Summerhill Baptist Church Newport for many years". In 1953 he was awarded the MBE for services to education and to Monmouthshire".

Hando died on 17 February 1970, at St. Joseph's Nursing Home in Newport, at the age of 81. His last article, on District and Street Names, appeared in the South Wales Argus four days before his death.

Works

Hando's aim in writing his articles was set out in the preface to his The Pleasant Land of Gwent, published in 1944; "to persuade readers to see the little places of a shy county". Monmouthshire's set pieces, such as Raglan Castle and Tintern Abbey were not his focus, he wrote of lesser known sites such as the "Virtuous Well" at Trellech, "the tallest house in Monmouthshire" at Treowen, and the medieval boundary marker at Croes Llwyd. His scope was broader than buildings; in his foreword to the 1964 volume, Here and There in Monmouthshire, Edwin Morris, the then Archbishop of Wales, describes Hando's canvas as "reminiscence, folklore, local history, place names and introductions to interesting people, past and present, illustrated by his own beautiful drawings". He took a relatively early interest in conservation. In his article on Allt-y-Bela, published in Journeys in Gwent in 1951, he wrote of the house's perilous state of dilapidation, noting "unless immediate and drastic action is taken, we shall lose priceless relics". Fifty years later, in the Gwent/Monmouthshire Pevsner, the architectural historian John Newman described Allt-y-Bela as "miserably derelict". His concern for preservation extended beyond individual buildings to the wider Monmouthshire landscape. An article published in Monmouthshire Sketch Book in 1954, was entitled "The Threat to Machen Vale" and condemned plans by the Central Electricity Generating Board to construct an electricity generating station in the Vale.

The vanishing folklore and customs of Monmouthshire were of particular interest to Hando. More than one article covered the Mari Lwyd, a horse's skull covered by a sheet and borne aloft on a pole, which formed part of Christmas celebrations in the county. In a number of articles, including one on The Skirrid in Monmouthshire Sketch Book, he wrote of the legends of Jack o' Kent, who was said to have caused the cleft in the Skirrid's summit by jumping to it from the Sugar Loaf, some four miles distant.

Monmouthshire's pubs were another topic of abiding interest. Hando wrote of, and drank and smoked in, a large number of the country's hostelries, the Robin Hood Inn, Monmouth being a particular favourite. In his Monmouth Town Sketch Book, he recalls a visit in 1947, when he encountered "the last of the Monmouth 'cards'".

Hando's Pictorial Guide to the Wye Valley and the Forest of Dean is the only one of his books which took the form of a conventional travel guide, as opposed to a collection of articles.

Legacy
After his death the Monmouthshire Local History Council set up several "Hando seats" at viewpoints in the county that he had considered to be particularly fine. Funded by public subscription, the seats were located in Dixton churchyard; at Llandegfedd Reservoir; on Lawrence Hill, Newport; at the top of the Wyndcliff, St. Arvans; and near Keeper's Pond on the Blorenge near Blaenavon. Nearly 50 years after his death, Hando and his work are still cited in 21st century controversies. His detailed chronicling of the county's history was referenced in the debate on the construction of an extension of the M4 motorway across the Gwent Levels; and the late Paul Flynn, former member of parliament for Newport West, recalled the "halcyon days" of Hando's columns in a discussion about declining journalistic standards at the South Wales Argus.

From November 2017, the South Wales Argus re-published his weekly "Rambles in Gwent" column, giving readers the opportunity to again enjoy his material which captured, as Argus editor Kenneth Loveland described it, "The shy beauty of this delectable county".

Family
His daughter, Margaret, was born in April 1916. She graduated from St Anne's College, Oxford, and later married Charles Smith, later Delacourt-Smith, in 1939.  Her husband became a Labour MP in 1945 and later a Government minister, and was ennobled in 1967.  She was a councillor and Justice of the Peace in Windsor in the 1960s. After her husband's death, she was herself raised to the peerage in 1974 as Baroness Delacourt-Smith of Alteryn.  She remarried in 1978 and died in 2010 at the age of 94. Margaret's brother, from Hando's first marriage, to Alice, was John.

Hando also had a son, Robert, from his second marriage.

Bibliography

Books by Fred Hando
(all published by R. H. Johns, Newport)
 Rambles in Gwent (1924)
 The Pleasant Land of Gwent (1944) With an introduction by Arthur Machen. (including limited Deluxe Edition of 220 copies, signed by the author)
 Journeys in Gwent (1951) (including limited Deluxe Edition of 350 copies, signed by the author), OCLC 754992827
 Pictorial Guide to the Wye Valley and the Royal Forest of Dean (1952), (Edited by W. A. Stoker)
 Monmouthshire Sketch Book (1954)
 Out and About in Monmouthshire (1958)
 Monmouth Town (1964)
 Here and There in Monmouthshire (1964)

Collections and appreciations
Collections of Hando's articles, edited by Chris Barber:
 Hando's Gwent (1987) 
 Hando's Gwent Volume 2 (1989) 

An appreciation of Hando's work, Fred J Hando, A Proud Son of Gwent, including some of his writings and drawings, was published by his relative David Hando in 2014.

Footnotes

References

Sources

External links
 
"Hando Oak" at caerleon.net

1888 births
1970 deaths
People from Newport, Wales
British Army personnel of World War I
20th-century Welsh historians
Welsh schoolteachers
History of Monmouthshire
Architecture in Wales
History of Wales